is a Japanese Tarento. Hashimoto's father is Japanese and her mother is Chinese Hakka.

Filmography

Variety series

TV drama

Other TV series

Radio series

Radio drama

Internet series

Films

Stage

Advertisements

Publications

Readings

Videos

Books

Photobooks

Adult videos

Magazines

References

External links 

 

Japanese entertainers
Japanese child actresses
1993 births
Living people
Actresses from Beijing
Japanese people of Chinese descent
21st-century Japanese actresses
Japanese YouTubers